Them Boys may refer to:

"Them Boys", a song by Brantley Gilbert from his album Halfway to Heaven
The Briscoes, a professional wrestling tag team known as "Dem Boys"